The diamondback puffer (Lagocephalus guentheri) is a species of pufferfish in the genus Lagocephalus.

Description
Diamondback pufferfish have a dorsal stripe that ranges in color from very light bluish to grayish to tan. Their fins are usually blackish-brown, but in some specimens, they are dark to light, vivid blue. The diamond pattern on their backs can sometimes seem absent because of them blending into the skin, as in the grey- and brown-backed forms. They range in size from 3-7.9 inches (7.9–20 cm).

Habitat & distribution
Diamondback puffers range from the coasts of South Africa to Pakistan, Japan and northern Australia. They can live in shallow water habitats such as mangroves but on the oceanic shelf they can reach 237 m depth. The species was first introduced in 1930 in the Mediterranean Sea in Greece and is now common in all the eastern Basin.

References

External links
.

Fish described in 1915
Lagocephalus